Richie Vernon (born 7 July 1987) is a former Scotland international rugby union player with London Scottish. He previously was with Glasgow Warriors, playing for the Glasgow side over two spells. He has also previously played for the now defunct Border Reivers and Sale Sharks.

Rugby union career

Amateur career

Educated at the High School of Dundee, Vernon then played for Dundee HSFP.

Vernon has been drafted to Currie in the Scottish Premiership for the 2017-18 season.

Professional career

Vernon started his pro career at the Border Reivers until they disbanded in 2007. His contract was then move to Glasgow where he would breakthrough into the team playing mainly at No. 8 or openside flanker.

With the establishment of the "Killer B's" as the first choice back row at Glasgow, he left the Warriors in 2011 for Sale Sharks, signing a two-year deal with hopes for more gametime to develop his game and enhance his prospects for more caps with Scotland.

At the end of 2013 he returned to Glasgow. However, he struggled to tie down a regular starting place in the back row due to injuries form and also stiff competition within the squad. This led to an unusual conversion in position to centre  following discussions with Warriors head coach Gregor Townsend and Scotland coach Scott Johnson, who hope to more readily use his 6-foot, 5-inch frame and evident pace.

Vernon announced his retirement from rugby to finish at the end of the 2018-19 season on 12 March 2019.

International career

Vernon played Rugby Sevens for Scotland between 2005-2008, gaining his first cap in the Dubai Tournament.

Vernon won his first cap for Scotland as a replacement for Johnnie Beattie in the 23–10 victory over Fiji in the 2009 Autumn Internationals.

References

External links
RBS 6 Nations profile
Scotland profile
GlasgowWarriors.com profile

1987 births
Living people
People educated at the High School of Dundee
Scottish rugby union players
Glasgow Warriors players
Sale Sharks players
Scotland international rugby union players
Rugby union players from Dundee
Rugby union flankers
Scotland international rugby sevens players
Dundee HSFP players
Currie RFC players
Male rugby sevens players
London Scottish F.C. players
West of Scotland FC players
Ayr RFC players
Stirling County RFC players